Florida Playwrights' Theatre or FPT was a 54-seat black box theatre in Hollywood, Florida that was in operation from 1993 to 1999.  It was begun by Paul and Angela Thomas, whose goal was to create a small repertory company that would produce new plays and little-known plays, as well as the classics, including their annual Shakespeare festivals.

New plays premiered
 "Apathy-The Gen X Musical" by Mickey Zetts (Both as a late-night 1995 and a mainstage 1997)
 "Love is a Masochist" by Mickey Zetts (shown with "The Piano that Jack Filled", adapted by Duncan Pflaster from the song-cycle by Adam Rabin) 1996.
 "Wilder and Wilder by Duncan Pflaster (Both as a late-night and a mainstage - 1995)
 "Amazing Dædalus" by Duncan Pflaster (Late-night 1997)
 "Audition Pieces" by Kim Mowrey
 "The Jessie Donovan Show" by Roberta Morgan

Other plays produced
1993
 Dancin' to Calliope by Jack Gilhooley
 Eli: A Mystery Play of the Sufferings of Israel by Nelly Sachs
 The Mystery of Irma Vep by Charles Ludlam
 Sister Mary Ignatius Explains It All for You by Christopher Durang
 Psycho Beach Party by Charles Busch
 Greater Tuna by Jaston Williams, Joe Sears, and Ed Howard
 1st Annual Shakespeare Festival
 Twelfth Night
 As You Like It
 The Miss Firecracker Contest by Beth Henley
 Double bill of Graceland by Ellen Byron and Line by Israel Horovitz
1994
 Oedipus Rex by Sophocles
 The House of Blue Leaves by John Guare
 The Taming of the Shrew by William Shakespeare
 Messiah by Martin Sherman
 A Woman Called Truth: The Story of Sojourner Truth by Sandra Fenichel Asher
 The Children's Hour by Lillian Hellman
1995
 Angel City by Sam Shepard
 Lenny by Julian Barry (Carbonell Award won  for Best Actor Todd Durkin, nominated for Best Supporting Actor Larry Jurrist)
 2nd Annual Shakespeare Festival
 Much Ado About Nothing
 A Midsummer Night's Dream
 The Secret Lives of The Sexists by Charles Ludlam
 Laundry and Bourbon and Lone Star by James McLure
 What The Butler Saw by Joe Orton
 Oleanna by David Mamet
 The Loman Family Picnic by Donald Margulies
 On the Verge (or The Geography of Yearning) by Eric Overmeyer
 Reckless by Craig Lucas
1996
 Macbeth by William Shakespeare
 Talk Radio by Eric Bogosian
 3rd Annual Shakespeare Festival
 The Comedy of Errors
 Two Gentlemen of Verona
 The Mystery of Irma Vep by Charles Ludlam
 Laughing Wild by Christopher Durang (Carbonell Award 'nomination for Best Actress Angela Thomas)
 American Buffalo by David Mamet
 Times Square Angel by Charles Busch
1997
 Betty the Yeti: An Eco Fable by Jon Klein
 4th Annual Shakespeare Festival
 The Merry Wives of Windsor
 Romeo and Juliet
 The Diary of Anne Frank by Frances Goodrich and Albert Hackett
 Mass Appeal by Bill C. Davis
1998
 5th Annual Shakespeare Festival
 Hamlet
 The Tempest
 Black Comedy/White Lies by Peter Shaffer
 The Art of Dining by Tina Howe
 Titanic by Christopher Durang

External links
 Small Wonder Article from New Times Broward/Palm Beach

Theatre companies in Florida
Hollywood, Florida